United States gubernatorial elections were held on November 2, 1909, in three states. Virginia holds its gubernatorial elections in odd numbered years, every 4 years, following the United States presidential election year. Massachusetts and Rhode Island at this time held gubernatorial elections every year, which they would abandon in 1920 and 1912, respectively.

Results

References

Notes

 
November 1909 events